Ken Morgan (born September 10, 1951) is an American politician. He is a member of the Mississippi House of Representatives from the 100th District, being first elected in 2007. He is a member of the Republican party.

References

1951 births
Living people
Republican Party members of the Mississippi House of Representatives
21st-century American politicians
People from Columbia, Mississippi